Annopol  is a town in south-eastern Poland (historic Lesser Poland), located in Kraśnik County. It has been situated in Lublin Voivodeship since 1999, having previously been located in Tarnobrzeg Voivodeship (1975–1998).

History
Annopol received town rights in 1761, lost them in 1870 and regained on 1 January 1996. Its coat of arms shows St. Anna, the patron saint of the town (the name means Anna's city, from Greek polis). It owes its picturesque location to the Lesser Polish Gorge of the Vistula.

Jews began to settle in the town in the early 1600s. 73% of the town's population was Jewish by 1921. During the Holocaust, a ghetto was created by the Germans. Jews from nearby villages and smaller towns, as well as from Kalisz and Łódź, were displaced to the Annopol ghetto. Jews from the ghetto were sent to the labor camps in nearby Rachów and Janiszów. The ghetto was liquidated on October 15, 1943 and most of the Jews were murdered at the Belzec extermination camp.

The history of Annopol is inextricably linked to that of Annopol-Rachów village close by, often combined as one and the same in written records.

Transport
Annopol does not have a rail station, but the town is placed along national road 74, which goes from Piotrków Trybunalski to the Ukrainian border at the village of Zosin. Voivodeship roads 824 and 854 also pass through the town. The Vistula river road bridge at Annopol was built in 1967.

Gallery

References

External links

  
 Jewish community of Annopol on Virtual Shtetl
 

Cities and towns in Lublin Voivodeship
Holocaust locations in Poland
Kraśnik County
Lublin Governorate
Lublin Voivodeship (1919–1939)